Micrathena lucasi is a spider in the orb-weaver spider family, Araneidae. The species belongs to genus Micrathena and was first named in 1864 by Eugen von Keyserling.

References

Spiders described in 1864
Araneidae